Dangerous: The Double Album is the second studio album by American country music singer Morgan Wallen. The double album was released on January 8, 2021, via Big Loud Records and Republic Records on CD, vinyl, and digital download. The production on the album was handled by Joey Moi, Jacob Durrett, Charlie Handsome, Matt Dragstrem and Dave Cohen. It also features guest appearances by Chris Stapleton and Ben Burgess.

Dangerous was preceded by the release of two singles: "More Than My Hometown", and "7 Summers"; and six promotional singles: "Cover Me Up", "This Bar", "Heartless (Wallen Album Mix)", "Somebody's Problem", "Still Goin' Down",  and "Livin' the Dream". The album also received generally positive reviews from music critics and was a commercial success. It debuted at number one on the US Billboard 200 and US Top Country Albums charts, earning 265,000 album-equivalent units in its first week.

In March 2022, the album established the all-time record for longest duration in the #1 spot (98 weeks and counting) on Billboards Country Albums chart.

Background
Wallen stated: 

Shortly before the release of the album, several CDs were erroneously put up for sale at certain Walmart locations in the United States. This prompted several consumers to leak clips of unreleased songs, to which Wallen responded by saying "If anyone’s gonna leak my music, it should be me" and releasing "leaks" of unreleased songs himself. He also urged his fans to buy the physical release at Target instead, adding: "I don’t shop at Walmart anyway. I also gave Target two extra songs, so if you’re going to buy my album physically, go to Target, baby".

Walmart responded to the issue with this statement provided to the Rolling Stone:

Critical reception

Owen Myers of Pitchfork complimented Wallen's vocals and songwriting alongside writing that "among the album’s 30 tracks there are few skips." Jonathan Bernstein of Rolling Stone felt the opposite, calling the record "part album, part playlist, part content dump" and that "Wallen does not always seem up to the heavy task of pumping fresh life into well-worn topics." Writing for Stereogum, Chris DeVille wrote that though "Wallen’s look is old-fashioned, his sound is thoroughly, sometimes maddeningly current" and called the record "a massive leap from his debut" while adding "if the tracklist feels excessive, it also doesn’t have a lot of weak spots" and that "the guy seems capable of becoming Garth Brooks for a new generation." Jon Pareles of The New York Times wrote that Wallen "leaves ample room for musical variety" and called the record "modern Nashville studio product, aimed for radio playlists and, eventually, big concert spaces."

Chris Richards, writing for The Washington Post, opined that the album "feels about 19 songs too long" and that "time never seems to be moving fast enough [on it]." Dan DeLuca of The Philadelphia Inquirer wrote that the album "gets tiresome fast" and called it "overstuffed with radio-ready cliche," but did recognize Wallen's overall talent. Stephen Thomas Erlewine of AllMusic wrote that "the sheer variety proves Wallen can indeed convincingly sing just about any modern country style" and felt that the album weaved between "harder country and softer pop."

Commercial performance
Dangerous: The Double Album debuted at number one on the US Billboard 200 and US Top Country Albums charts, earning 265,000 album-equivalent units (including 74,000 copies as pure album sales) in its first week, according to MRC Data. This became Wallen's first US number one debut and his second on the latter. The album also accumulated a total of 240.18 million on-demand streams, becoming the largest streaming week ever for a country album at the time. This more than doubles the record set by Luke Combs' What You See Is What You Get. In its second week, the album remained at number one on the chart, earning an additional 159,000 units making it the first country album to spend two weeks at number one since Chris Stapleton's Traveller in 2015 and the first country set to spend its first two weeks at number one since Luke Bryan's 2015 album Kill the Lights. In its third week, the album remained at number one on the chart, earning 130,000 more units. In its fourth week, the album remained at number one on the chart, earning 149,000 units. It received a 14 percent increase from the previous week, despite the nationwide removal of Wallen's music throughout radio stations in the United States following his use of a racial slur outside of his Nashville home on February 2, 2021. It concurrently became the first country album to spend its first four weeks atop the Billboard 200 chart since Shania Twain's Up! did so in January 2003. In addition, it later extended its run with a fifth and sixth week at the top, marking the longest run atop the charts for a country album since Garth Brooks' The Chase in 1992. The album eventually spent a total of ten weeks at number one on the Billboard 200 and ended up becoming the best selling album for the first half of 2021. As of September 2021, the album has earned 2,539,000 album-equivalent units and has sold 267,000 copies in the United States.

The album has been certified 4x Platinum in the United States and Canada and Gold in Australia.

Track listing

Notes
 "Country Ass Shit" is stylized as "Country A$$ Shit".
 All tracks produced by Joey Moi.
 "Wasted on You" and "Bandaid on a Bullet Hole" feature co-production by Jacob Durrett.
 "Warning" features co-production by Charlie Handsome.
 "Your Bartender" features co-production by Matt Dragstrem.
 "Cover Me Up" features co-production by Dave Cohen.

Personnel
Adapted from the album liner notes.

Tom Bukovac – electric guitar
Ben Burgess – duet vocals on "Outlaw"
Dave Cohen – Hammond B-3 organ, keyboards
Matt Dragstrem – programming
Jacob Durrett – programming
Paul Franklin – steel guitar
Charlie Handsome – programming
Wes Hightower – background vocals
Mark Holman – programming
Jake Mitchell – programming
Joey Moi – electric guitar, programming, background vocals
Niko Moon – programming
Jerry Roe – drums, percussion
Daniel Ross – programming
Ernest K. Smith – background vocals
Jimmie Lee Sloas – bass guitar
Chris Stapleton – duet vocals on "Only Thing That's Gone"
Bryan Sutton – acoustic guitar, banjo, dobro, mandolin
Ilya Toshinsky – acoustic guitar
Morgan Wallen – lead vocals, background vocals
Derek Wells – accordion, electric guitar

Charts

Weekly charts

Year-end charts

Certifications

Release history

References

2021 albums
Albums produced by Joey Moi
Big Loud albums
Country pop albums
Morgan Wallen albums